Neni (pronounced as Ne-ni by the natives), is an Igbo speaking town in Southeastern Nigeria.

Location
Neni is located in the Anaocha Local Government Area of Anambra State. Its geographic coordinates are 6" 09' 00 North, 7" 02' 00 East.
It also hosts the headquarters of the Anaocha Local Government Area.

The present traditional leader of Neni town is Damian O. Ezeani (Igwe Ezeani Ugonabo).

Its neighboring towns are Akwaeze, Oraukwu, Agulu, Obeledu, Ichida, Nimo, Aguluzigbo, Adazi-Ani, Adazi-Nnukwu, and Nri. Neni comprises ten villages: Umueze, Eziaja, Umudioka, Etitinabo, Ezineni, Umunri, Umuabani, Umukabia, Okofia, and Ugwudunu.

Traditional festivals in Neni community

Neni has many cultural festivals that are observed yearly; Igu Aro/Ogwe – performed by Okofia village on every 1st day of January
each year at the Oye Market Square in the morning to herald the New year and its good tidings to the community. Village Days – observed on 26 December of each year such as Umueze Day, Eziaja Day, Umuabani Day, etc. It’s a day mapped out by some villages to interact and celebrate the reunion of the villages with fan and fanfare. New outing of dances and masquerades are featured on that day.

Ufejioku Umueze – this festival is celebrated on every second week of August each year to announce the maturation of new yam as well as display the new yam harvested at "ODU UMUEZE " at the market square before new yam could be sold at Oye Market Neni.

New Yam Festival – this is celebrated on every third week in August each year at the Igwe’s palace with fanfare as dance and masquerades displays
are featured with " Ndi Nze na Ozo and Igwe’s Cabinet present ", the next day is general Iwa-Ji by the community. Mmanka Arts and Culture– this is
displayed by the "Nka Diokas " of Umudioka village at Mmanka stadium on every 31 December of each year.

"Itu Mbubu, Igbu-ichi, Iwa-eze, masquerades and dances feature in the Arts and Culture displays at Mmanka Festival. This festival attracts distinguished personalities from all over the country to Neni. Masquerade Carnival – The Masquerade Carnival display at the Oye Market Square by all the villages on 1 January, every year is synonymous with Neni culture as this festival attracts spectators from within Anaocha Local Government
Area and environs.

People
Neni is the ancestral home of prominent Nigerians, including:

 Colonel (retired) Robert Akonobi; Former military governor of Anambra State.
 Chief Anthony Enukeme OON; Industrialist and founder of Tonimas Group.
 Chief Vincent Amaechi Obianodo MON; Chairman of Young Shall Grow Group.
 Engr. Paul N. Enidom; MD/CEO of Paul-B Nigeria Plc.
 Chief Patrick Tobechukwu Chidolue; Chairman of Chelsea Group.
 Chief Michael Okpala also known as "Power Mike" MON; undefeated World Heavyweight wrestling champion.
 John Obi Mikel; Nigerian professional footballer and former Chelsea midfielder
 Chioma Stephanie Obiadi; Miss Nigeria 2016
 Chukwuka Emelionwu; CEO Kas-Vid International
Mrs Elizabeth Agbala [former HOD]

References

Populated places in Anambra State